Ronald Suresh Roberts (born 17 February 1968) is a British West Indian biographer, lawyer and writer. He is best known for his biographies of some of the leading figures in the "New South Africa" such as Nobel Prize winner Nadine Gordimer and former South African President Thabo Mbeki. Roberts has been described by Nelson Mandela as "a remarkable and dynamic young man". He currently lives in London, England.

Early life
Roberts was born in Hammersmith, London, to an Afro-Caribbean father and an Indo-Malaysian mother. His parents met while studying law but decided to move back to Roberts's father's homeland of Trinidad and Tobago shortly after Roberts was born. In Trinidad, Roberts attended Fatima College high school before being accepted into Balliol College, Oxford.  He attended Oxford on the same Trinidad Government scholarship previously awarded to V. S. Naipaul. Roberts went on to graduate in 1991 from Harvard Law School, where he was a classmate of Barack Obama.  Roberts’s thesis, "Clarence Thomas and the Tough Love Crowd: Counterfeit Heroes and Unhappy Truths", was published by New York University Press. His supervisor, Professor Randall Kennedy, taught a Harvard class in "Race Relations and American Law", which became a flashpoint for ongoing civil rights and campus activism at the time.  Obama initially attended the highly polarised class, but did not complete it.

Roberts left a promising career as a Wall Street lawyer to monitor South Africa’s first multiracial elections in 1994.

Life in South Africa
Roberts arrived in South Africa as part of a delegation of international election monitors, and quickly became captivated by the uniquely change-making events of the new South African era. He stayed on over two decades and  became immersed in the re-architecture of the South African constitution and institutions, especially the new bill of rights. Through his work with  ANC lawyer Kader Asmal, he advocated for and advised upon a broadening of socio-economic rights in the new South African constitution. It was through this work with Kader Asmal that he became involved with the Truth and Reconciliation Commission. Asmal, Roberts and Louise Asmal later collected their thoughts in one of the first scholarly discussions of Truth and Reconciliation, entitled Reconciliation through Truth: A Reckoning of Apartheid’s Criminal Governance, a book for which Nelson Mandela wrote the preface.  Mandela's Deputy and successor as President, Thabo Mbeki, spoke at the launch of the book in Cape Town.

Roberts then served the Mandela and Mbeki administrations variety of political and technical roles, both developing and defending post-apartheid policies.  He was Policy and Strategy Advisor to Kader Asmal.

Biographies
Roberts's first biography was of white South African writer and Nobel Laureate Nadine Gordimer. Roberts first approached Gordimer regarding a biography in 1996 shortly after the completion of his second book, which Gordimer had admired, describing it in a blurb as "blazingly honest, unafraid to be controversial" and "written with verve and elegance". Gordimer agreed to co-operate with the biography, with the condition that she would read the resulting manuscript prior to its publication. After several years of exhaustive interviews and research, Roberts provided Gordimer with a draft; Gordimer objected to Roberts's portrayal of her views on Israel, as well as a passage in which Gordimer recounted "making up" a famous anecdote.  She also objected to the quoting of derogatory comments Gordimer had made about such prominent South Africans as Ruth First and Doris Lessing. When Roberts refused to compromise, citing journalistic integrity, Gordimer blocked publication of the biography.

Publishers Bloomsbury Publishing in London and Farrar, Straus and Giroux in New York subsequently withdrew from the project. In letters to RSR both publishers praised the quality of the writing but cited Gordimer's refusal to authorise the biography as their reason not to publish it. Roberts characterized Gordimer's attempts to prevent publication of the biography as censorship and subsequently the manuscript was published by a small South African publisher, which defied Gordimer's threats against it. The saga surrounding the biography was told in a New York Times piece entitled "Nadine Gordimer and the Hazards of Biography".   
The title of the book, No Cold Kitchen, was a reference to Gordimer's perceived inability to  withstand any form of criticism.

Shortly after publishing No Cold Kitchen, Roberts was approached by South African President Thabo Mbeki to write the first authorized account of his intellectual and policy agendas. Called Fit to Govern: The Native Intelligence of Thabo Mbeki, the book was controversial for its insistent post-colonialism and focus on Mbeki as an African leader as opposed to a Western one. In the book Roberts argued that Mbeki's view on the link between HIV and AIDS, was not one of ignorance or denial but scientific curiosity—and that many of the points raised by Mbeki and initially controversial have since entered the orthodoxy.

Current work
Roberts has continued to write for many South African publications on subjects as diverse as politics, book reviews and cultural events. Roberts is known for his challenging viewpoints; in a 2007 column Mail & Guardian editor Ferial Haffajee said Roberts "tests my commitment to freedom of expression".

As of 2021, Roberts was a Visiting Senior Fellow in the Department of Sociology at the London School of Economics.

Controversy
In 2007 the controversial  author and AIDS denialist Anthony Brink accused Roberts of using elements of his own unfinished work in Roberts' biography of Mbeki. Roberts countered that Brink had no relevant research given that as late as 2005 Brink remained a "complete stranger to the president at a personal level".
 
In 2006 Leslie Weinkove, Acting Judge of the Western Cape High Court judgement, found against Roberts in a defamation case Roberts instituted against the South African newspaper The Sunday Times. The judgment gives detailed descriptions of his behaviour in dealing with a complaint against the South African Broadcasting Corporation. Roberts' response to the judgment was published in an extensive interview in the South African Mail & Guardian, which cites a suppressed letter from Ken Owen, a previous editor of The Sunday Times, which recognised The Times′ "eagerness to smear Ronald Roberts" and repudiated the words the newspaper had attributed to him, adding: "I must say that on matters within my knowledge [its] reporting is false."

In 2007 the same newspaper incorrectly placed Roberts, Christine Qunta and others in a group of 12 signatories to an article supposedly supporting AIDS denialism. Roberts complained and the Times issued a retraction and apology to the group.  Roberts accepted the apology but maintained that the newspaper's conduct was "shameful but not surprising."

In popular culture 
Roberts's work has formed the subject of at least one play and one novel. His dispute with Nadine Gordimer, and its significance as an emblem of the broader cultural tensions in South Africa's post-apartheid transformations, is the subject of the play The Imagined Land by Craig Higginson, the editor of Robert's Gordimer biography. The same issue forms the inspiration for Absolution by Patrick Flannery, 'an inquiry into the ethical accountability of the writer and the ethical and epistemological problems of "life-writing"'. The dispute is also covered by Dame Hermione Lee, President of Wolfson College, Oxford, in Biography: A Very Short Introduction.

References

Trinidad and Tobago non-fiction writers
South African biographers
Male biographers
South African male writers
Living people
Harvard Law School alumni
1968 births
Alumni of Balliol College, Oxford
Male non-fiction writers